CelcomDigi Berhad (d.b.a. celcomdigi), formerly known as Digi Telecommunications or Digi.Com Berhad (d.b.a. digi), is a communications conglomerate and mobile service provider in Malaysia. Axiata and Telenor hold equal ownership in CelcomDigi at 33.1% each. CelcomDigi is the largest wireless carrier in the Malaysia, with 20.3 million subscribers at the end of Q4 2022. 

CelcomDigi is listed on the Bursa Malaysia under the Infrastructure category act via the stock ticker symbol "CDB".

History 
On 21 June 2021, Axiata, Telenor and Digi agree to a potential merger of Celcom and Digi to create a stronger telco in Malaysia, coming after advanced discussions that took place two months earlier. If approved, the merger will be completed by the end of 2022. 

The deal was approved by both Celcom and Digi shareholders on 18 November 2022. The merged company is named CelcomDigi. At completion, Axiata and Telenor will hold equal ownership of 33.1% each in the newly merged company. The merger was completed on 30 November 2022 and the company began its operation the next day. Digi.com Berhad was later renamed to CelcomDigi Berhad on 27 February 2023.

Coverage, Products and Services

 
Digi operates 2G EDGE,  4G LTE and 4G LTE-A networks.

As of December 2017, Digi has 4G LTE coverage of 90% on populated areas,.  LTE-Advanced (LTE-A) population coverage was at 70% nationwide, likely measured at the lowest signal quality at -110dBm.

Digi Telecommunications Sdn. Bhd. provides a variety of mobile communication services. These services include voice under their prepaid plans & postpaid plans, SMS, data plans and services, international roaming, international calling card and WAP services.

Digi is the second operator in Malaysia to launch VoLTE, initially available to iPhones running iOS 10.1 and above.

Subscribers
As of fourth quarter of 2022, CelcomDigi had 20.3 million subscribers, comprised 66.8% prepaid subscribers, 32.9% postpaid subscribers and a small, fast growing fibre base at 0.3%  

Blended ARPU for Digi and Celcom remained stable at RM40 and RM46 respectively, driven by steady demand for all mobile product offerings.

See also
vcash, a defunct e-wallet service by Digi
DIGI, the biggest Romanian telecommunications company

References

External links
 

1995 establishments in Malaysia
Companies listed on Bursa Malaysia
Telecommunications companies of Malaysia
Companies based in Shah Alam
Telecommunications companies established in 1995
Mobile phone companies of Malaysia
Internet service providers of Malaysia
Malaysian brands
Axiata
Telenor
Malaysian subsidiaries of foreign companies
Malaysian companies established in 1995